Klevekåpa Mountain is an icecapped mountain,  high, with an abrupt southeast rock face, standing close northwest of the mouth of Snuggerud Glacier in the Filchner Mountains of Queen Maud Land, Antarctica. It was mapped by Norwegian cartographers from surveys and air photos by the Sixth Norwegian Antarctic Expedition (1956–60) and named Klevekåpa (the closet cloak).

References

Mountains of Queen Maud Land
Princess Astrid Coast